Năruja is a commune located in Vrancea County, Romania. It is composed of five villages: Năruja, Podu Nărujei, Podu Stoica, Rebegari, along with Lunca Narujei.

References

Communes in Vrancea County
Localities in Western Moldavia